The world economy, or global economy, is the economy of the world.

World Economy may also refer to:
 The World Economy (journal), an academic journal
 The World Economy: Historical Statistics, a book by Angus Maddison